Juli Erickson  is an American retired voice actress. Her earliest film appearance was a minor role in Michael Cimino's Heaven's Gate.  She went on to appear in live-action roles in Matlock and Walker: Texas Ranger, and starred as the Pola Negri-influenced character Apollonia Kowalski in the Mariusz Kotowski-directed Holocaust film Esther's Diary (2010).

Erickson also has a long list of English language anime voiceover credits. Some of her notable anime appearances include the English dub of the hit manga series Fullmetal Alchemist as Pinako Rockbell, and an appearance in the feature film Evangelion: 1.0 You Are (Not) Alone. She also voices Tsuru and Kokoro in One Piece, Ogen in Basilisk, Setsu in Samurai 7, and Shima in Ouran High School Host Club. On October 26, 2018, Erickson was announced to have retired from voice acting, with her recurring roles recast.

Filmography

Anime
 Basilisk - Iga Ogen
 BECK: Mongolian Chop Squad - Tamayo
 Birdy the Mighty: Decode - Yoshie Suzuki
 Case Closed - Kathleen Neighbers, Nonee
 D.Gray-man - Old Woman (Eps. 16-17), Spider Akuma (Ep. 42)
 Deadman Wonderland - Miyako
 Eden of the East: Paradise Lost - Toshiko Kitabayashi
 El Cazador de la Bruja - Bucho's Wife (Ep. 5)
 Eureka Seven: AO - Naru's Grandmother
 Fafner in the Azure: Heaven and Earth - Ikumi Nishio
 Fairy Tail - Ohba Babasama (Ep. 154-263)
 Fractale - Priestess (Ep. 3)
 Fullmetal Alchemist series - Pinako Rockbell (Winry's Grandmother)
 Gosick - Roxanne (Eps. 1, 3)
 Hal - Erika
 Hell Girl - Ai's Grandmother
 Hero Tales - Innkeeper (Ep. 3)
 Kamisama Kiss - Demon Hag (Ep. 1)
 Kodocha - Ms. Sakaki (Ep. 35), Shizuka Kurata
 Lupin the Third: The Woman Called Fujiko Mine - Old Woman (Ep. 5), Aisha's Mother (Ep. 13)
 Mushishi - Tama (Ep. 20)
 My Bride Is a Mermaid - Nagasumi's Grandmother
 My Hero Academia - Recovery Girl (Season 1 only)
 One Piece - Tsuru, Amazon, Kokoro, Additional Voices
 One Piece Film: Z - Tsuru
 Ouran High School Host Club - Shima Maezono (Eps. 10, 26)
 Overlord - Lissy Balear
 Pandora in the Crimson Shell: Ghost Urn - Anna
 Panty & Stocking with Garterbelt - Panty's Granny (Ep. 13A)
 Samurai 7 - Setsu (Kirara's Grandmother)
 Selector Infected WIXOSS series - Hatsu Kominato
 Shiki - Tae Yano
 Strike Witches series - Yoshiko Akimoto (Yoshika's Grandmother)
 Toriko - Setsuno

Movies
 Halloween: The Night Evil Died - Pamela Strode

Live action
 Forgiveness  Esther's Diary – Apollonia

References

External links
 
 

1939 births
Living people
American voice actresses
21st-century American women